Damir Ravilevich Shadaev (born November 3, 1967 in Leningrad, Russian SFSR) is a member of the State Duma of Russia. He is a member of the LDPR, and is Deputy Chairman of the State Duma's Committee on Natural Resources and Utilization. Previously, he was a Deputy in the Leningrad Oblast duma, and represented the region in the Federal Council. Shadaev has a degree from the North-West Academy of Government Services.

References

1967 births
Living people
Fourth convocation members of the State Duma (Russian Federation)
Liberal Democratic Party of Russia politicians